Niagara Parks School of Horticulture is both an educational institution and a public botanical garden that is maintained by dedicated staff and students with a united objective to educate, cultivate, and preserve ornamental plants. The school bills itself as an alternative to post-secondary training for horticulture by providing students with a 36 consecutive month program combining practical and academic studies. The School of Horticulture is part of the Niagara Parks Commission located in Niagara Falls, Ontario.

History

The school was founded in 1936 as the Niagara Parks Commission Training School for Apprentice Gardeners and renamed with the current name in 1959.

Admissions and Programs

Admissions to the school requires applicants with prior horticulture experience plus Ontario Secondary School Diploma (or equivalent). The schools will accept a maximum of twelve students per year. Two academic semesters run on a ten week rotation, starting Labor day. When students aren't in academic classes they can be found outside, maintaining the grounds of the Botanical Garden.

Graduate receives a diploma in Ornamental Horticulture upon completion of required courses and practical application over 3 years.

Campus

Training for students are conducted at the Niagara Parks Botanical Gardens, Butterfly Conservatory and the Niagara Parks Greenhouses. First and second year students have the opportunity to live in the residence, located on the botanical gardens grounds.

The School of Horticulture students are responsible for maintaining the Niagara Botanical Gardens on a year-round basis. Regular garden maintenance continues into the fall semester of the academic season and winter tree pruning and greenhouse work are completed through the winter semester of the academic season.

Notable Graduates

 Alfred H. Savage - horticulturalist in the 1950s and 1960s, he later became a transit manager with the Toronto Transit Commission and Chicago Transit Authority

Rival Schools in Canada

 Algonquin College in Ottawa, Ontario offers a 2 year diploma in Horticultural Industries
 University of Guelph - BSc in Crop, Horticultural and Turfgrass Sciences, Diploma in Turfgrass Management and Horticulture Diploma
 Redeemer University College - BSc in Horticulture

References

External links
 School of Horticulture

Educational institutions established in 1936
Higher education in Ontario
Buildings and structures in Niagara Falls, Ontario
Niagara Parks Commission
1936 establishments in Ontario